The scorched-earth defense is a form of risk arbitrage and anti-takeover strategy. 

When a target firm implements this provision, it will make an effort to make itself unattractive to the hostile bidder. For example, a company may agree to liquidate or destroy all valuable assets, also called crown jewels, or schedule debt repayment to be due immediately following a hostile takeover. In some cases, a scorched-earth defense may develop into an extreme anti-takeover defense called a poison pill.

See also
Scorched earth

Mergers and acquisitions